Computer Boy is a 2000 short film by Australian director Abe Forsythe. It is a parody of The Matrix. It gained a cult following after being released over the internet, receiving over 350,000 views on Ifilm. It was filmed in Sydney, Australia and uses many of the same locations as The Matrix. 

It was never fully released, the film had an injunction put against it, forcing them to never really release it fully. The total production cost was rumoured to only have cost $2500.

This is the transcript direct from one of the hosts:

Metro has often been appalled by the bloated budgets of Hollywood blockbusters. Now an 18-year-old film-maker from Newtown has laid bare Tinsel Town's shameless profligacy by making his own version of The Matrix - which was rumoured to have cost more than $100 million - for $2,500(AUS)!
Forsythe, who has seen The Matrix three times, was inspired by spoofs of The Blair Witch Project and his own irritation at Matrix audiences who ooh-ed and aah-ed when they recognised chunks of their own city on the silver screen.

He admits he had to cut a few corners to bring Computer Boy in under budget. Besides writing and directing, he took on the role of Agent Smith, the character played by Hugo Weaving in the original.

"I played him as a mixture of Hugh Grant, Dr. Evil and Sean Connery," says Forsythe.

Morpheus, the mysterious cyber-guerilla played by Laurence Fishburne, is portrayed by Marcus Pointon. 

The role of "Neo", played by Michael Falzon in a manner reminiscent of Keanu Reeves's character "Ted" from Bill and Ted's Excellent Adventure earned a Best Actor Award at the Melbourne Underground Film Festival

Not content with paying homage to The Matrix, Forsythe aimed to enhance the original plot as well.

Cast
 Michael Falzon as Neo
 Marcus Pointon as Morpheus
 Simone Chapman as Trinity
 Abe Forsythe as Agent Smith
 Marc Turner as Agent Kowalski
 Brett Garten as Agent Jones
 Daniel Peters as Cypher
 Daniel Tobar as Tank
 Andrew Brittain as Hobo
 Alexander Hazelbrook as Spoon Boy
 Justin Hazelbrook as Colour Book Boy
 Sharyn Winney as Sheet Girl
 Charles Falzon as Chuck
 Ryan Tan as Asian
 Miguel Sanchez as Bob/Oracle/Hobo/Juggler/Koala

Music

New Moon contains an ID3 artist tag of Sinister Sam.

Lenehan's downloadable version contains several incorrect ID3 tags, claiming the title is Computer Suite from Little Boy - Flight And Countdown (1968), an unrelated song Jean-Claude Risset; the ID3v1 comment field contains Copyright (c) Lance Lenehan.  It's speculated that these tags were incorrectly generated by some sort of automatic song detection or ID3-labelling software as a result of detecting the phrase "computer boy".  The official movie home page at the time contained references to Lenehan's old MP3 repository at mp3.com.

A post from April 27th, 2000 on Usenet newsgroup aus.films states that the film contains "...new music by Lance Lenehan as well as tracks by up and coming bands Sinister Sam and The Stud & Track House Band."

References

External links

Watch Computer Boy at iFilm.com
Watch Computer Boy at Spike.com
Download Computer Boy via AusGamers
Download New Moon MP3 file

2000 films
2000 short films
Australian comedy short films
2000s parody films
Films shot in Sydney
2000 comedy films